Spas is a federal channel in Russia which is associated with the Russian Orthodox Church. It started broadcasting in on July 28, 2005. The main owner of the channel is the Moscow Patriarchate of the Russian Orthodox Church. The founders of the TV channel are Alexander Batanov (died 2009) and Ivan Demidov.

Overview
The mission of the channel is a formation of moral philosophy and a system of coordinates needed for effective development of the state, based on the old aged Orthodox values, development and strengthening of spiritual and moral foundations of the Russian state.

Its main activities are:

1. Information - coverage of the Russian Orthodox Church, Moscow Patriarchate, and the Patriarch of Moscow and all Rus' with reflection of the Russian Orthodox Church to the events of political, economic and cultural life of Russia. 
2. Education - spiritual and moral education and religious education of the Russian people, especially children and youth enabling them to gain knowledge of God, Orthodoxy and Orthodox culture. 
3. Catechesis - promoting Russian Orthodox Church in matters of catechesis, or in other words, teaching people in the faith. 
Program policy: 60% percent of the airtime is devoted as a public broadcasting channel with documentaries and educational and training programs. 40% of the airtime is devoted to Orthodox subjects. A significant number of programs are produced in their own studio named Poliformatnoy, including Live Shows. This constitutes the basis of either the studio's own production and spiritual orientation for the 18 + audience, as well as documentaries.

Broadcasting
As a result of the competition held in Roskomnadzor on September 25, 2013, it has the right to broadcast as part of the second digital television multiplex in Russia.

Digital terrestrial TV
On October 23, 2013 at 15:00 Moscow Time, Russian Television and Radio Broadcasting Network (RTRS, the national transmittion network) began broadcasting the channel in digital television in the second multiplex RTRS-2 in the standard DVB-T2. The first digital broadcast "Saviour" was published as a cultural and educational program for children and youth.

IPTV
The channel is part of the interactive IPTV Rostelecom.

Cable TV
The channel broadcasts on multiple cable television operators in Russia and CIS.

Satellite broadcasting
Broadcasting is carried by the satellite Yamal200 number 1 90°E. The signal covers almost the entire territory of the Russian Federation, the Commonwealth of Independent States, Baltic States, Eastern Europe, a number of Western European countries, as well as Central and South-East Asia.

Broadcasting is also performed with the platforms NTV Plus (in the "West Light" package) and Tricolor TV (in the "Super-Optimum" package) via satellite Eutelsat W4,36°E.

Block 
On March 16, 2022, YouTube blocked the channel. The channel announced its transition to Rutube.

References

Mass media companies of Russia
Companies based in Moscow
Russian-language television stations in Russia
Television channels and stations established in 2005
2005 establishments in Russia
European Broadcasting Union members